Carex andersonii is a species of sedge that was first described by Francis Boott in 1846. It is native to Chile and Argentina.

References

andersonii
Flora of South America